Sir Thomas Fowell Buxton, 3rd Baronet,  (26 January 1837 – 28 October 1915), commonly known as Sir Fowell Buxton, was the Governor of South Australia from 29 October 1895 until 29 March 1899. He was the grandson of Sir Thomas Fowell Buxton, a British MP and social reformer, and the son of Sir Edward North Buxton, also an MP.

He attended Harrow School and Trinity College, Cambridge. He was commissioned captain in the Tower Hamlets Rifle Volunteers (No. 3) on 4 May 1860. He married Lady Victoria Noel, daughter of Charles Noel, 1st Earl of Gainsborough, and Lady Frances Jocelyn, daughter of Robert Jocelyn, 3rd Earl of Roden on 12 June 1862.  Of their 13 children, ten survived infancy, including Sir Thomas Buxton, 4th Baronet, Noel Edward Noel-Buxton, 1st Baron Noel-Buxton, Charles Roden Buxton, and Rt. Rev. Harold Jocelyn Buxton, Bishop of Gibraltar in Europe. Lady Buxton was crippled by a spinal condition in 1869.

Sir Fowell was elected as Liberal Member of Parliament (MP) for King's Lynn at the 1865 general election, but was defeated at the 1868 election. After his defeat, he stood again for Parliament unsuccessfully on several other occasions: in Westminster at the 1874 general election, in Western Essex at the 1880 general election and at the by-elections in Northern Norfolk in 1876 and 1879. He was appointed High Sheriff of Norfolk in 1876.

When Buxton was appointed governor, the Premier of South Australia, Charles Kingston was angry that the South Australian government had not been involved in the decision about who should be the new governor, so made life as hard as possible for Buxton and his family. The governor's allowance was reduced and customs duty was charged on their household items (including his wife's invalid carriage). Buxton took up the job anyway, and later was described as the most genial, sociable and common-sense governor, due to his gentle and unassuming friendliness. He visited gaols and hospitals, and showed genuine interest in Aboriginal culture during his time as governor. He eventually returned to England due to the ill-health of his wife.

A memorial to Sir Fowell and his wife Victoria was erected in St Thomas' Church in Upshire in Essex in 1917, designed by Sir Robert Lorimer.

Notes

References
 Buxton Progenitor

External links
 
 Robinson family history (the governor's military orderly)

1837 births
1915 deaths
People educated at Harrow School
Alumni of Trinity College, Cambridge
Governors of South Australia
Governors of the Colony of South Australia
Baronets in the Baronetage of the United Kingdom
Knights Grand Cross of the Order of St Michael and St George
Liberal Party (UK) MPs for English constituencies
UK MPs 1865–1868
British Militia officers
Fowell
Deputy Lieutenants of Essex
Deputy Lieutenants of Norfolk
High Sheriffs of Norfolk
British social reformers
British colonial governors and administrators in Oceania